Zir Anay, also rendered as Zir Ana, may refer to:
 Zir Anay-e Olya
 Zir Anay-e Sofla